Glen Forbes was a railway station on the Wonthaggi railway line, located on the Bass Coast, Victoria, Australia. The station opened with the line in 1910 and was originally called "Kernot". The name was changed to Glen Forbes in 1915. The station operated until the early 1970s, shortly before the closure of the Wonthaggi line.

The platform mound of the station and a nearby trestle bridge are the only remains of the railway.

References

Disused railway stations in Victoria (Australia)
Transport in Gippsland (region)
Bass Coast Shire